Fox (or Fuchs-Wiesel Inc.) is an Israeli-based fashion chain specializing in women's, men's, children's, and babies' fashions: FOX, FOX MEN, FOX KIDS, FOX HOME and FOX BABY.

History

Fox was founded in 1942 in The British Mandate of Palestine (now Israel) as Trico Fox Ltd. (Hebrew: טריקו פוקס בע"מ).  After having its IPO on TASE in 2002, the company became Fox-Wizel Ltd. Today, Fox is an international chain with stores in ten countries: Israel, Russia, Singapore, China, Bulgaria, Croatia, Romania, Thailand, Panama and the Philippines. In Fall 2008, Fox stores opened in Canada. There is also one store in Munich, Germany.

Fox also has a joint partnership (50%) in Laline Candles & Soaps Ltd. The company is headquartered in Ben Gurion International Airport, near Tel Aviv.

In 2008, Fox encountered criticism and faced a potential consumer boycott in Israel when they signed Israeli supermodel Bar Refaeli, who avoided Israel's mandatory military service via a nuptial exemption for a marriage lasting a short period of time, on a $300,000 campaign deal. Fox responded by having Refaeli plan to act as an IDF "Enlistment Officer" and visit injured soldiers.

Spokesmodels 
Yael Bar Zohar
Esti Ginzburg
Michael Lewis
Agam Rodberg
Bar Refaeli
Eithan Urbach
Tomer Kapon
Shlomit Malka

See also
Israeli fashion
Castro
Hamashbir Lazarchan
Honigman
TNT

References

External links
Fox.co.il - Fox Israel
Fox.bg - Fox Bulgaria
Foxfashion.sg - Fox Singapore
Foxcanada.ca - Fox Canada

Clothing brands
Clothing retailers of Israel
Clothing companies of Israel
Israeli brands
Clothing companies established in 1942
Companies listed on the Tel Aviv Stock Exchange
Retail companies established in 1942
1942 establishments in Mandatory Palestine